NTV7 is a Malaysian free-to-air channel owned by Media Prima Berhad. The network focused on the Urban area with various types of programmes, dramas and news. As of October 2021, NTV7 is now become the second most-watched television station in Malaysia with about 15% of its viewing share, together with TV9, despite the declining viewership of 2 free-to-air television channels.

History

Establishment, as part of Media Prima and early history (1996–2018)

The channel was launched on 7 April 1998 under the entity of Natseven TV Sdn Bhd by businessman Mohd Effendi Norwawi, broadcasting daily from 6 am to 1 am the next day. At the time of its establishment, its headquarters was located at Hicom-Glenmarie Industrial Park in Shah Alam, Selangor. It also had a studio in Kuching, Sarawak.

In 2001, NTV7 began using a variation of the Circle 7 logo used by the American broadcast network ABC for its several owned-and-operated and affiliated stations; the logo would stay in use until 2018.

In 2005, Media Prima Berhad announced its acquisition of NTV7 under a price of RM90 million, effectively making the latter one of its subsidiaries. As a result, it operates from Sri Pentas, Petaling Jaya from that year onward along with three other private television channels in Malaysia: TV3, 8TV and TV9.

In its early history, the channel offered a wide variety of programming which targets the Malaysian urban demographic including drama, comedy, entertainment, game shows, children's programmes, anime, documentaries and movies. There were also news bulletins in English, Mandarin and Malay through the 7 Edition, Mandarin 7, and Edisi 7 brands, respectively.

Introduction of home shopping block (2016–2021) 
On 1 April 2016, a teleshopping block bought by the Korean conglomerate CJ Group through subsidiary CJ E&M Co Ltd called CJ WOW Shop (now Wow Shop) was broadcasting across Media Prima channels. Several Media Prima channels (especially NTV7 and TV9) were more affected by the changes. It attracted public criticism on social media as a large part of the daytime schedule was replaced by the block, in which these slots had been previously dedicated to reruns, religious programming and kids programming.

On 1 November 2020, CJ Wow Shop was rebranded into Wow Shop after Media Prima bought the remaining 49% stake in the teleshopping network previously held by CJ Group.

Modern Malaysia era (2018)
From 5 March 2018, Media Prima attempted a new brand positioning for NTV7. The channel tried to target "Modern Malaysia" as a contemporary station through its new content line-up, including new Turkish Telenovelas; as well as its new slogan Feel It. The relaunch saw major changes as it became a dominated English-Malay language channel, with the channel name read as "n-t-v-tujuh" instead of "n-t-v-seven." Also, infomercial programming was reduced upon the channel's rebranding.

Chinese content reduction attempt
Upon the March 2018 rebranding, Chinese content on this channel was reduced to selected Chinese dramas from Hong Kong and China along with Mandarin news bulletins, with much of the remainder transferred to sister channel 8TV (which also attempted to reposition as Media Prima's sole all-Chinese channel on the same day). Originally, Mandarin 7 was supposed to be cancelled in May 2018 to complete its plan of moving all Chinese content to a single dedicated channel. However, when the 2018 General Election occurred, the bulletin became Malaysia's second-most watched after TV3's Buletin Utama (the said spot was formerly held by Berita TV9). Due to the Chinese community's positive response, Media Prima decided to reshuffle NTV7's news programming in June instead of axing Chinese news. In this format, only one news bulletin per language was aired on the channel with a single Mandarin newshour, while retaining half-hour editions in Malay and English.

Reverting to Chinese content (2018–2020)
The rebrand caused confusion among viewers, particularly Chinese communities who tuned in to NTV7 after finding out that most of its former programmes were moved to 8TV. Overall Chinese viewership was believed to be surprisingly lower.

As a result, on 31 December 2018, the former CEO of Media Prima Television Networks, Johan Ishak, said that the Mandarin variant of CJ Wow Shop would be broadcast on the channel and replace the Malay variant. The move was part of the company's restructuring NTV7 by axed English and Malay-language shows, dropped the channel nomenclature, moved some (including those from TV9) to the main TV3. It also brought back the channel's perception as a Chinese channel; yet the channel's Mandarin, Malay and English news bulletins remained unchanged.

Reruns of axed NTV7 shows were then aired on TV9 after the former's retreat while slogan "Feel it" was removed.

Mandarin 7 discontinuation (2020)
On 7 June 2020, Mandarin 7 aired its final edition and was merged into 8TV Mandarin News the following day. 8TV Mandarin News was also extended to one hour due to high ratings during the Movement Control Order (MCO) and COVID-19 pandemic in Malaysia.

Programming change, Ministry of Education collaboration and takeover (2020–present)
On 1 November 2020, CEO of Media Prima Television Networks, Dato' Khairul Anwar Salleh announced that NTV7 would be targeted for ages 15–28 by focusing on magazines, information and current affairs programs to meet the public needs, while Korean dramas would stop airing and all Chinese programmes have finally been integrated to 8TV. Korean variety show Running Man remains on this channel along with homeshopping block Wow Shop.

On 18 November 2020, DidikTV@ntv7, an educational programming block was introduced by Ministry of Education from 23 November 2020 until 16 January 2021. It formerly ran from 9am to 12pm every Monday to Friday. It was later split into two timeslots (9am-12pm and 3pm-5pm) on 27 January 2021, resulting the educational programming to be aired daily.

DidikTV KPM

On 12 February 2021, as the Ministry of Education will have a one-year term with Media Prima, it was announced that NTV7 will be rebranded through a takeover as a fully educational TV channel known as DidikTV KPM starting 17 February; the new channel will focus on educational content based on SPM curriculum and co-curriculum. It would also provide news focused on education, edutainment programs, and content produced by the students. The channel will have 17 hours of airtime and will run daily from 7am to 12am.

On 16 February 2021, Media Prima confirmed to The Edge Markets that ntv7 will not be defunct, while the current team will be focusing on DidikTV KPM.

Since the DidikTV KPM launch, the main newscasts Edisi 7 was ceased entirely in replacement with Buletin Didik while 7 Edition moved to digital platforms; though it was later discontinued in May due to DidikTV KPM slot. Homeshopping block Wow Shop was ceased from airing on the channel. Soal Drama and  Running Man were transferred to TV9 since 21 February 2021. Some of the original programming such as Trio On Point, Topik@7 (now Topik), Breakfast@9PM, Kail X and Jurnal Resipi will continue to air.

During the DidikTV@7 segment, the channel airs documentary, drama (weekends only), lifestyle, and cartoon programmes. Only certain programmes broadcast in Chinese language such as Let's Cycle (season 1) hosted by Rickman Chia and Baki Zainal.

From 15 to 30 September 2021, according to the viewership statistics from Media Prima Omnia, the viewership share for NTV7 has increased from 2% to 15%, making the channel become the second most-watched television station in Malaysia after TV3 (which the viewership share for TV3 is about 17%), together with TV9, which has the same viewership share of 15%.

Gallery

See also 
 List of television stations in Malaysia
 TV3
 TV9
 8TV
 Circle 7 logo

References

External links 
 
 
 

1998 establishments in Malaysia
Media Prima
Television stations in Malaysia
Television channels and stations established in 1998
Mass media in Petaling Jaya
Chinese-language television